Rok Flander (born 26 June 1979 in Kranj) is a Slovenian snowboarder.

Flander is currently 3rd in the overall standings of the 2006-07 Snowboarding World Cup, having won a race in Kronplatz and finishing second in Sölden. He finished 7th in the Parallel Giant Slalom at the 2006 Winter Olympics, 8th at the 2010 Winter Olympics, and 6th at the 2014 Winter Olympics.

On 16 January 2007, he became world champion in the Parallel Giant Slalom in Arosa, Switzerland. A day later, he also won bronze in Parallel Slalom.

World Cup

Podiums

References

External links
 

1979 births
Living people
Slovenian male snowboarders
Snowboarders at the 2006 Winter Olympics
Snowboarders at the 2010 Winter Olympics
Snowboarders at the 2014 Winter Olympics
Olympic snowboarders of Slovenia
Sportspeople from Kranj